A list of Principals of Harris Manchester College, Oxford. The head of Harris Manchester College, is called the Principal. This list also includes the heads of the predecessor institutions of the college, Manchester New College and Manchester College, Oxford.

Principals of Manchester New College
1840–1846 Robert Wallace
1846–1850 John Kenrick
1850–1853 George Vance Smith
1853–1869 John James Tayler
1869–1885 James Martineau

Principals of Manchester College, Oxford
1885–1906 James Drummond
1906–1915 Joseph Estlin Carpenter
1915–1931 Lawrence Pearsall Jacks
1931–1938 John Henry Weatherall
1938–1949 Robert Nichol Cross
1951–1956 Sidney Spencer
1956–1965 Lancelot Austin Garrard
1965–1974 Harry Lismer Short
1974–1985 Bruce Findlow
1985–1988 Anthony John Cross

Principals of Harris Manchester College, Oxford
1988–2018 Ralph Waller
2018–present Jane Shaw

References

 
Harris Manchester Principals
Harris Manchester College, Oxford